Oscar Roberto Castellano (born September 15, 1948 in Lobería, Buenos Aires Province), is an Argentine racing driver. He won the Turismo Carretera championship in 1987, 1988 and 1989.

References

1948 births
Living people
Argentine racing drivers
Turismo Carretera drivers
Sportspeople from Buenos Aires Province
Motorsport team owners